Washington Township is a township in Crawford County, Iowa, USA.  As of the 2000 census, its population was 293.

Geography
According to the USGS, it contains four cemeteries: Buck Grove, Clinton County Farm, Washington Township and Washington Township.

References
 USGS Geographic Names Information System (GNIS)

External links
 US-Counties.com
 City-Data.com

Townships in Crawford County, Iowa
Townships in Iowa